The Denmark national under-21 speedway team is the national under-21 motorcycle speedway team of Denmark and is controlled by the Danish Motor Union. The team started in Under-21 World Cup in all editions and won five medals: one gold (2010), two silver (2008 and 2009) and two bronze (2005 and 2006). Denmark has produced three Under-21 World Champions: Gert Handberg (1989), Brian Andersen (1991) and Jesper B. Jensen (1997). In 1977 and 1978 two Danish riders, Alf Busk and Finn Rune Jensen, was won Individual U-21 European Championship. Tommy Knudsen was won 1980 Individual U-21 European Championship open for riders from all continents.

Competition

Team B

See also 
 Denmark national speedway team
 Denmark national under-19 speedway team

External links 
 (da) Speedway at Danish Motor Union webside

National speedway teams
Speedway
Team
!